Aureivirga is a Gram-negative, aerobic and non-motile genus of bacteria from the family of Flavobacteriaceae with one known species (Aureivirga marina). Aureivirga marina has been isolated from the sponge Axinella verrucosa from the coast near Sdot Yam.

References

Flavobacteria
Bacteria genera
Monotypic bacteria genera
Taxa described in 2013